17α-Methyl-19-norprogesterone (developmental code name H-3510), also known as 17α-methyl-19-norpregn-4-ene-3,20-dione, is a progestin which was never marketed. It is a derivative of progesterone, and is the combined derivative of 17α-methylprogesterone and 19-norprogesterone. The drug is the parent compound of a subgroup of the 19-norprogesterone group of progestins, which includes demegestone (the δ9 derivative), promegestone (the δ9 and 21-methyl derivative), and trimegestone (the δ9, 21-methyl, and 21-hydroxyl derivative).

See also
 Gestronol (17α-hydroxy-19-norprogesterone)

References

Abandoned drugs
Diketones
Norpregnanes
Progestogens